Dr Law Chi-kwong, GBS, JP (born 1 November 1953) is a Hong Kong politician who served as Secretary for Labour and Welfare between 2017 and 2022. He is an associate professor in social work at the University of Hong Kong.

He was a founding member of the Democratic Party of Hong Kong and its honorary secretary and spokesperson for women's issues, until he left the party to serve in the government.

He served in the Legislative Council, in the Social Welfare functional constituency, between 1995 and 2004 except during the Provisional Legislative Council, serving on the Social Welfare Advisory Committee as well as many governmental and non-governmental bodies.

In 2014, he was awarded the Gold Bauhinia Star by the government.

Education and academic career
Law studied for his bachelor's degree in economics and statistics and a master's degree in social work at the University of Hong Kong. He went on to earn an MBA at the Chinese University of Hong Kong and a doctorate in social welfare from the University of California, in Los Angeles.

In 1981, he took up a teaching role in the Department of Social Work and Social Administration at the University of Hong Kong, and has remained on the staff since. From 1993 to 1997, he was head of department.  His current position is associate professor.

Law has been chairman of the Senior Citizen Home Safety Association and an executive member of the Hong Kong Council of Social Service. He has also been a board member of the Hong Kong Social Workers Association.

Political career
Law was elected to the Legislative Council in the Social Welfare constituency, in 1995, 1998 and 2000, thus serving from 1995 to 2004, except for one year of the Provisional Legislative Council.

He has served on the Commission on Strategic Development since 2005, and the Steering Committee on Child Development Fund since 2008.  He has been a member of the Land and Development Advisory Committee since 2009, and a member of the Commission on Poverty since 2012.

In 2017, he was nominated by Carrie Lam to serve as Secretary for Labour and Welfare. He withdrew from the Democratic Party prior to his appointment, because the party bars its members from serving in a government chosen by the pro-Beijing camp.

In the 1990s, Law was one the "best-known advocates for democracy and the rule of law," but later switched his position to be pro-Beijing, avoiding inquiries about his change of opinion.

In February 2022, Law claimed that fundraising to help domestic helpers who had been fined by the government for social gathering could be illegal.

Personal life
Law is divorced and has a daughter and a son.

References

Dr Law Chi-kwong, GBS, JP, Secretary for Labour and Welfare
Member of the Legislative Council – Hon Law Chi-kwong, JP
Dr. LAW Chi Kwong, The Department of Social Work and Social Administration – HKU

1953 births
Living people
Members of the Executive Council of Hong Kong
Democratic Party (Hong Kong) politicians
United Democrats of Hong Kong politicians
Alumni of King's College, Hong Kong
HK LegCo Members 1995–1997
HK LegCo Members 1998–2000
HK LegCo Members 2000–2004
Hong Kong educators
Members of the Election Committee of Hong Kong, 2007–2012
Members of the Election Committee of Hong Kong, 2012–2017
Academic staff of the University of Hong Kong
Recipients of the Gold Bauhinia Star
Recipients of the Silver Bauhinia Star